Pariah is a 1998 American dramatic film written and directed by Randolph Kret and starring Damon Jones, Dave Oren Ward, and Angela Jones.

Synopsis
The gang-rape by a group of neo-Nazis of an African American woman, Sam (Elexa Williams), triggers her suicide. Her caucasian boyfriend Steve (Damon Jones) finds little recourse other than to plot revenge, and decides to infiltrate the gang. As a member he gains insight into the factors behind the neo-Nazi movement, but he is eventually confronted with the choice of committing a murder to prove his loyalty or reveal his cover.

Cast

Production
Randolph Kret wrote and directed the film which is based on an incident from the life of a friend. The Scott Grusin film score includes songs by anti-racist hardcore bands Minor Threat, Social Unrest and the Wives.

Reception and review
Roger Ebert wrote that "Godard said that one way to criticize a movie is to make another movie. Pariah, a raw and unblinking look at the skinhead subculture, is a movie I'd like to show to those admirers of Fight Club who have assured me of their movie's greatness."  Ebert gave the film three out of four stars. The Los Angeles Times called the film "a volatile, edgy picture of strong visceral impact."TV Guide called it a "well-meaning but ridiculous revenge drama".  Bill Gibron of DVD Talk rated it 3/5 stars and wrote that while the film is realistic, it may not entertain viewers. In a negative review, Michael Atkinson of The Village Voice wrote, "Kret clearly has his heart in the right place: Hate Is Bad. If only being right were all you needed." On Rotten Tomatoes the film has a rating of 47% from seventeen reviews.

New York Times reviewer A. O. Scott commented that the theme of an "ordinary, tolerant white person going undercover into a world of extreme race-hatred" was a promising one and adds that the movie opens with a voiceover of the Rev. Dr. Martin Luther King Jr. warning that "racism is a sickness unto death". He compares Pariah to the 1988 Constantin Costa-Gavras film Betrayed starring Debra Winger and Tom Berenger which had a similar plot. He also wrote, "Racist extremism is a problem. We need movies that address it. Chances are you already agree with these propositions. All Pariah succeeds in doing is screaming them at you, at maximum volume, over and over and over."

Release
The Randolph Kret written and directed film was screened at the 1998 Slamdance Film Festival before a limited theater release.

Home media
The film was released on DVD on July 11, 2006.

References

External links
 
 
 

1998 films
1998 drama films
American drama films
American independent films
Films about dysfunctional families
Films about race and ethnicity
Films about racism
Films set in Los Angeles
Films shot in Los Angeles
American gang films
Films about neo-Nazism
Skinhead films
1990s gang films
1998 directorial debut films
1990s English-language films
1990s American films